Colorado Boulevard (or Colorado Street in Glendale and Arcadia) is a major east–west street in Southern California. It runs from Griffith Park in Los Angeles east through Glendale, the Eagle Rock section of Los Angeles, Pasadena, and Arcadia, ending in Monrovia. The full route was once various state highways but is now locally maintained in favor of the parallel Ventura Freeway (SR 134) and Foothill Freeway (I-210).

Route description

West end

The west end of Colorado Boulevard is composed of two segments: a disconnected surface street segment of Colorado Boulevard, and the Colorado Street Freeway Extension. Colorado Boulevard begins at a cul-de-sac near the Los Angeles River in Los Angeles and continues east. The road passes on/off-ramps to the eastbound Colorado Street Freeway Extension, and Edenhurst Avenue, which provides access to the westbound freeway. The segment terminates at West San Fernando Road near the Los Angeles-Glendale city limits, and picks up across the railroad corridor at San Fernando Road in the city of Glendale as Colorado Street.

The Colorado Street Freeway Extension begins at Interstate 5 (Golden State Freeway) as a short freeway spur, originally carrying State Route 134 until it was moved north onto the Ventura Freeway, but is still maintained by Caltrans. After crossing the Los Angeles River, there is an eastbound interchange with Colorado Boulevard (signed as Edenhurst Avenue), a westbound interchange with Edenhurst Avenue, and an eastbound interchange with Elk Avenue (signed as San Fernando Road). The freeway then terminates at Colorado Street in Glendale. Traffic exiting the Colorado Street Freeway Extension cannot turn west onto Colorado Street, but eastbound traffic from Colorado Street can enter the freeway. The freeway's entrances are signed as entrances to Interstate 5.

At the east border of Glendale, Colorado Street becomes Colorado Boulevard as it crosses State Route 2 (Glendale Freeway) into Los Angeles (specifically, the neighborhood of Eagle Rock). Another short freeway spur splits west of the intersection with Figueroa Street, heading northeast to the Ventura Freeway. This spur also carried SR 134 after the Ventura Freeway was built to the east but before it was built west of the split with the spur. After crossing Figueroa Street, Colorado Boulevard splits from Linda Vista Avenue and then passes over the Arroyo Seco on the Colorado Street Bridge into Pasadena.

Through Pasadena

In Pasadena, Colorado Boulevard crosses the short State Route 710 spur and forms the north end of State Route 110 (Arroyo Parkway). Colorado Street, renamed "Boulevard" in 1958, runs through Old Town Pasadena from Arroyo Parkway to Orange Grove Boulevard. It is the north–south zero axis of the street grid in Pasadena (the east–west axis is Fair Oaks Avenue). The Tournament of Roses parade route travels north on Orange Grove Avenue then east along Colorado Boulevard as far as Sierra Madre Boulevard, where it heads north to Victory Park. Most major Pasadena attractions are found along or within one block of Colorado Boulevard. Pasadena City College is located at 1570 E. Colorado Boulevard. The street was mentioned in Jan and Dean's 1964 hit song The Little Old Lady from Pasadena. The road leaves the city into unincorporated East Pasadena, where it intersects Rosemead Boulevard (Former State Route 19), all while formerly signed as California State Route 248.

Through Arcadia and Monrovia

Colorado Boulevard becomes Colorado Street as it crosses Michillinda Avenue from East Pasadena into Arcadia. Through Arcadia, the street parallels the Foothill Freeway, providing access to many of the neighborhoods in west Arcadia; freeway access is provided via a separated interchange with Baldwin Avenue.  Colorado Street then turns southeast and splits into two streets—Colorado Boulevard, which continues east, and Colorado Place, a short segment of old US 66 that goes southeast to merge with Huntington Drive near the Santa Anita Racetrack.

From the split, Colorado Boulevard (originally named Orange Street) becomes a primarily residential street, with some commercial zones near Santa Anita Avenue in Arcadia.  The street passes under the Foothill Freeway between First and Second Streets in Arcadia with no access, in front of Monrovia High School, and through Old Town Monrovia before ending at Shamrock Avenue at Recreation Park in Monrovia. (This segment of Shamrock Avenue was once part of an early alignment of US 66 and had been named Foothill Boulevard.)

The Santa Anita Depot, built in 1890 to serve Lucky Baldwin, and the people of Rancho Santa Anita, was located at Colorado Boulevard and Old Ranch Road. It was moved to the Los Angeles County Arboretum and Botanic Garden during the construction of the 210 Foothill Freeway in 1970.

History

The most original portion of Colorado Boulevard ran from Orange Grove Boulevard to Broadway, now Arroyo Parkway. This portion of the street always contained many shops, banks, hotels, and major commercial industries. By the late 19th century, this part of Colorado had become so popular, it was becoming a traffic bottleneck, and as early as May 1900 there were public outcries to the City Council to widen the road. It wasn't until 1929 that the City undertook the major and unprecedented task of cutting back the buildings along Colorado  on each side. This undertaking created a monumental amount of legal red tape as well as many engineering dilemmas which were handled with amazing results. At the same time many of the Victorian facings on the buildings were replaced with Spanish and Art Deco designs.

The Colorado Street Railway began operations in Pasadena on November 9, 1886, bringing mass transit to the street via the new horsecar service. The line was electrified in 1903 and was eventually absorbed into the Pacific Electric system. The Lamanda Park Line and other local services operated in the center of the roadway until January 19, 1941.

Colorado Street and Colorado Boulevard carried pre-1964 Legislative Route 161 from its west end to the merge with Huntington Drive (via Colorado Place). This was signed as State Route 134 west of Figueroa Street, U.S. Route 66 Alternate (US 66 before the end of 1940) from Figueroa Street to Arroyo Parkway, and U.S. Route 66 from Arroyo Parkway to Huntington Drive.

In 1954, the Colorado Freeway was opened between Holly Street in Pasadena and Eagle Vista Drive and Colorado Boulevard in Eagle Rock to help alleviate traffic congestion due to the narrow Colorado Street Bridge over the Arroyo Seco.  The new freeway connected the two communities until 1971, when the entire freeway was closed and upgraded, as well as partially rerouted as the new Ventura Freeway.  A short segment of the original Colorado Freeway remains as an on-ramp/off-ramp between Colorado Boulevard in Eagle Rock and the Figueroa Street off-ramp of the present Ventura Freeway.

In the 1964 renumbering, LR 161 remained State Route 134 west of Pasadena, though this was being moved to the new alignment (now the Ventura Freeway); until the freeway was completed through Pasadena in the mid-1970s, Colorado Boulevard was still signed as State Route 134 between Orange Grove Avenue and Arroyo Parkway. Through and east of Pasadena, LR 161 became State Route 248, but was signed as US 66 and continued east on Huntington Drive to the interchange with Interstate 210 (Foothill Freeway) in Monrovia. In 1965, this was to be deleted when I-210 was completed.

The US 66 shields began to come down along the length of Route 248 in 1975, soon after Interstate 210 was completed through Pasadena.  SR 248 was never signed as such, though it did appear on some maps in the 1970s and 1980s.  The segment within the city of Pasadena was deleted from the state highway system in 1986. The rest was removed in 1992. Along with the moving of SR 134 to the Ventura Freeway, this resulted in Colorado Street and Colorado Boulevard becoming a local road.

Transit

Colorado Boulevard is served by several bus routes, operated by Metro and suburban systems. Metro Local line 180 serves most of Colorado Boulevard, running between Hollywood and Pasadena. Also, Foothill Transit line 187 serves parts of Colorado Boulevard, beginning in Old Pasadena. LADOT DASH Eagle Rock/Highland Park serves most of Colorado Boulevard in Eagle Rock. Glendale Transit line 6 serves Colorado Street in Glendale.

Controversies
Metro has identified Colorado Boulevard as a potential bus rapid transit corridor, part of a line between North Hollywood station and Pasadena approved in 2016's Measure M. The bus rapid transit project would need to include removable components to allow for the annual staging of the Rose Parade.  Some local residents fear increased traffic congestion due to the proposed bus rapid transit route, while others support increasing access to high-quality transit.

In popular culture

The street is mentioned in the 1964 Jan & Dean single The Little Old Lady (from Pasadena), with the protagonist described as the "terror of Colorado Boulevard."

See also

References

External links

Streets in Los Angeles County, California
Streets in Los Angeles
Streets in Pasadena, California
Streets in the San Gabriel Valley
Transportation in Glendale, California
Boulevards in the United States
Arcadia, California
Monrovia, California
Southern California freeways
U.S. Route 66 in California